John Bailhache (May 8, 1787 – September 3, 1857) was the 10th mayor of Columbus, Ohio. The Columbus City Council appointed him to complete the remaining two-year term of John Brooks after he resigned his office on April 21, 1835. His successor after 1836 was Warren Jenkins.

References

Bibliography

Further reading

External links
John Bailhache at Political Graveyard

Mayors of Columbus, Ohio
1787 births
1857 deaths
People from Saint Ouen, Jersey
19th-century American politicians
Members of the Illinois House of Representatives
Members of the Ohio House of Representatives